Roy G. Fitzsimmons (1916 – May 5, 1945) was an American Polar Explorer and Geophysicist. Born LeRoy Fitzsimmons, he was the youngest child of John and Alice Brown Fitzsimmons and was one of 10 children.

Roy graduated from Seton Hall College in 1937 with a Physics degree. He was trained in Magnetometry by the Carnegie Institution. He served as Geophysicist and Magnetologist on the MacGregor Arctic Expedition July 1, 1937 through October 4, 1938. He was a member of the United States Antarctic Service Expedition (Byrd's third expedition) 1939 through 1941 where he worked at West Base on magnetometry, aurora studies and seismology in the Rockefeller Mountains where a peak bears his name.

During World War II Roy was a Captain in the United States Army Air Forces. He was killed on May 5, 1945 while returning from active duty in Cuba. He is buried in Newark NJ. His survivors included six nieces and nephews.

References

Sources
Inglis, Robert: "A Scout Goes North", 1938
MacGregor, Clifford J.: "Monthly Weather Review", October 1939
Vogel, Hal: "Ice Cap News", Nov–Dec 1977
Vogel, Hal: "They Brought Their Own Storms", 1977
Inglis, Robert: "Rutgers University Oral History Archives" October 27, 1998
Stonehouse, 'Bernard: "The Encyclopedia of Antarctica and the Southern Oceans", 2002

External links
 
 MacGregor Arctic Expedition; Monthly Weather Review
 Rutgers University Oral History Archive
 Oral History, Robert Inglis
 Roster of World War II Dead – Ancestry.com

1916 births
1945 deaths
American explorers
Explorers of the Arctic
Explorers of Antarctica
Seton Hall University alumni
United States Army Air Forces personnel killed in World War II
United States Army Air Forces officers